Vincentia is a genus of cardinalfishes native to the eastern Indian Ocean and the southwestern Pacific Ocean. The generic name refers to Gulf St Vincent in South Australia, where the type specimen of V. waterhousii was collected.

Species
The recognized species in this genus are:
 Vincentia badia G. R. Allen, 1987 (scarlet cardinalfish)
 Vincentia conspersa (Klunzinger, 1872) (southern cardinalfish)
 Vincentia macrocauda G. R. Allen, 1987 (smooth cardinalfish)
 Vincentia novaehollandiae (Valenciennes, 1832) (eastern gobbleguts)
 Vincentia punctata (Klunzinger, 1879) (orange cardinalfish)

References

Apogoninae
Taxa named by François-Louis Laporte, comte de Castelnau
Marine fish genera